Gávea is an affluent residential neighborhood located in the South Zone of the city of Rio de Janeiro, Brazil. It borders São Conrado, Leblon, Lagoa and Jardim Botânico neighborhoods and is famous for its high concentration of artists. PUC-Rio, as well as several schools, are located in the neighborhood. Gávea is well known because of the "Baixo Gávea" area, which is considered a Bohemian quarter.

The first Europeans to have lived in what would become the neighborhood were the French, who came to extract Brazilwood. On July 16, 1565, the neighbourhood was named Gávea for the first time, by Estácio de Sá.

Etymology
The neighborhood is named Gávea (which means topsail in Portuguese) because of an 852 m peak (Gávea Rock, or Pedra da Gávea) that resembles the topsail of the carrack, a sailing ship.

Sports
The Hipódromo da Gávea is a horse racing venue located in the neighborhood. Estádio da Gávea the home of CR Flamengo football club, despite being named after the neighborhood, is located in the Lagoa neighborhood. Gávea was the site of a street circuit that hosted Grand Prix racing in the 1930s and 1940s.

Notable people
Yasmin Brunet, model

References

Much of the content of this article comes from the equivalent Portuguese-language Wikipedia article (retrieved on January 2, 2006).

External links
Os Bairros (the districts of Rio de Janeiro, in Portuguese)

Neighbourhoods in Rio de Janeiro (city)
1565 establishments in the French colonial empire